Aspidodiadema meijerei is a species of sea urchin of the family Aspidodiadematidae. Its armor is covered with spines. It is placed in the genus Aspidodiadema and lives in the sea. Aspidodiadema meijerei was first scientifically described in 1906 by Döderlein.

See also 
 Aspidodiadema intermedium
 Aspidodiadema jacobyi
 Aspidodiadema montanum

References 

meijerei
Animals described in 1906